The Frank J. Lausche State Office Building is a 1979-erected 204 foot 15 story high-rise in downtown Cleveland on the corner of West Superior and Prospect Avenue on the city's Tower City Center complex.  It sits in front of the 2002-built Carl B. Stokes United States Courthouse. The buildings majority of tenants (over 1300) work for the State of Ohio.  The structure cost the state $26 million to build in 1977-1979.
 That would be about $83.5 million in today's inflation rate. In front of the building sits sculptor Tony Smith's Last.

The uniquely shaped structure is actually seven-sided, which closely resembles the dimensions of the land it is built on as no more land was allotted to the project due to the fact that the Greater Cleveland Regional Transit Authority owned the air rights. The building was designed architect  Robert P. Madison.

Name
The Lausche is named after Frank Lausche, the 47th mayor of the city of Cleveland, who served from 1942 to 1945  He then became the 57th governor of the state of Ohio and served in that capacity from 1945 to 1947 and 1949 to 1957, having lost in between the 1947-1949 term.
Following this he served as a United States senator from 1957 to 1969.

References

See also
 List of tallest buildings in Cleveland
 List of mayors of Cleveland

Skyscraper office buildings in Cleveland
Government buildings in Ohio
Buildings and structures in Cleveland
Government buildings completed in 1979